Mohd. Izham Tarmizi bin Roslan (born 24 April 1991) is a Malaysian professional footballer who plays as a goalkeeper for Malaysian Super League club Sri Pahang, on loan from Johor Darul Ta'zim and the Malaysia national team.

Career statistics

Club

International

Honours

Club
Johor Darul Ta'zim
Malaysia Super League (8): 2014, 2015, 2016, 2017,2018,2019, 2020, 2021
Malaysian Charity Shield (7): 2015, 2016, 2018,2019, 2020, 2021,2022
Malaysia FA Cup: 2016
AFC Cup: 2015
Malaysia Cup (2): 2017,2019

International
 Malaysia
 Southeast Asian Games: 2011 Gold

Individual
 PFAM Player of the Month: May 2016

Personal life 
Izham was married Malaysian actress Mia Ahmad on March 2017 and had two children (a male and female) also waiting for 3rd .

References

External links
 

1991 births
AFC Cup winning players
Asian Games competitors for Malaysia
Association football goalkeepers
Competitors at the 2011 Southeast Asian Games
Footballers at the 2014 Asian Games
Johor Darul Ta'zim F.C. players
Living people
Malaysia international footballers
Malaysia Super League players
Malaysian footballers
Malaysian people of Malay descent
People from Terengganu
Southeast Asian Games gold medalists for Malaysia
Southeast Asian Games medalists in football